Anopina bonagotoides is a species of moth of the family Tortricidae. It is found in Puebla, Mexico.

References

Moths described in 2000
bonagotoides
Moths of Central America